Volvic is a brand of mineral water. Its source is in the Chaîne des Puys-Limagne Fault, Auvergne Volcanoes Regional Park, at the Puy de Dôme in France.

Over 50% of the production of Volvic water is exported to more than sixty countries throughout the world. Two bottling plants produce over one billion bottles of water annually and are the principal employers of the local Volvic commune.

History 
The first of the springs in the area was tapped in 1922, and the first bottles appeared on the market in 1938. In October 1993, the Volvic company was bought by Groupe Danone. Since 1997, Volvic has been using PETE, a recyclable material, to make their bottles.

The company became carbon-neutral during 2020. During the same year Volvic and the esports organisation Berlin International Gaming commenced a partnership.

Varieties

Volvic also produces a range of water that has natural fruit flavouring named Volvic Touch of Fruit, with sugar free options. Recent flavours include strawberry, summer fruits, orange & peach, cherry, and lemon & lime. Other ranges available are Volvic Juiced (water with fruit juice from concentrate), and Volvic Sparkling (sparkling flavoured water similar to Touch of Fruit).

Advertising campaigns 
The track "Bombay Theme" from the kollywood film Bombay's (1995) soundtrack is an instrumental orchestral piece composed and arranged by A. R. Rahman and conducted by K. Srinivas Murthy, recently featured in the television commercial for Volvic, starring Zinedine Zidane since 2000.

In Volvic's "1L = 10L FOR AFRICA" campaign, the company promised that for every one litre of Volvic purchased, they would provide ten litres of drinking water through their "well creation" programme with World Vision in Ghana, Malawi, Mali and Zambia.

Another recent campaign is the 14 Day Challenge, 
 in which people are challenged to drink 1.5 litres of Volvic mineral water every day for 14 days, to achieve hydration to the body and mind.

Volvic became the first brand in the history of Danone and advertising during 2006, when Danone paid an amount reaching seven figures for the first sponsorship made for television. The sponsorship took place on E4 and included the television shows How I Met Your Mother, The Inbetweeners, The Goldbergs and 2 Broke Girls, a  series from Guy Martin, a series of The Island and a reality survival series, Eden.

In 2007, a series of four Volvic adverts were released featuring a volcano named George and a T-rex named Tyrannosaurus Alan.

Alzheimer's study 
A 2006 study found that drinking Volvic could reduce the levels of aluminium in the bodies of people with Alzheimer's disease. There is a link between human exposure to aluminium and the incidence of Alzheimer's disease.

References

Sources

External links 

 

Bottled water brands
French brands
French drinks
Groupe Danone brands
Internet memes
Massif Central
Mineral water
1938 establishments in France
Food and drink companies established in 1938
Companies based in Auvergne-Rhône-Alpes